Pilane in Klövdal, Tjörn, Bohuslän, Sweden, is an Iron Age settlement site and grave field, dated to 1-600 AD. The grave field consists of approximately 90 ancient monuments, including stone circles, burial mounds, circular stone grave markers and standing stones. The site is under the care of the Swedish National Heritage Board and the land is leased as sheep pasture.

In the summer of 2007 the Pilane site started to be used for a seasonal outdoor sculpture exhibition: Skulptur i Pilane (Sculpture in Pilane). During its first year the exhibition had 60,000 visitors. The art activities are coordinated by the private, non-profit Pilane Heritage Museum, which is financed by the entry fees.

The site occupies a prominent position, with extensive views over land and sea. The Basteröd rock carvings site is nearby.

External links
 Official register (RAÄ-nummer Klövedal 105:1) at the Swedish National Heritage Board 
 Official website of the annual summer sculpture exhibition  

Bohuslän
Iron Age Scandinavia
Iron Age sites in Europe
Stone circles in Europe
Burial monuments and structures
Outdoor sculptures in Sweden
Tourist attractions in Västra Götaland County
Annual events in Sweden
History of Bohuslän
Germanic archaeological sites
Archaeology of Sweden
Sculpture exhibitions
Prehistory of Sweden